The Musée des beaux-arts de Morlaix is a fine arts museum in Morlaix, Brittany, France. It is also known as the Musée des Jacobins, since it opened in a former Jacobin convent (confiscated after the French Revolution) in 1889.

Collections
Its main works include Venus and Adonis by Giovanni Francesco Romanelli, The Martyrdom of Saint Bartholomew by Sébastien Bourdon and The Death of Hector by Joseph-Marie Vien. 19th century art is represented by Portrait of madame Andler by Gustave Courbet, The Pardon of Méros by Théophile Deyrolle, The Chemin de Bas-fort-Blanc by Élodie La Villette, A grain by Eugène Boudin and Rain at Belle-île by Claude Monet.

On his death in 1920, the painter Louis-Marie Baader left over 70 works to the museum. In 1927 it acquired 19 paintings and 4 drawings by the Australian artist John Peter Russell who had lived in Belle-Île-en-Mer. In 1999 it acquired the decorative features designed by Maurice Denis for his house of Perros-Guirec and an oil on canvas of 1906 by  Armand Berton : Toilette after bathing.

References

External links
Official website 

1889 establishments in France
Museums established in 1889
Art museums and galleries in France
Museums in Finistère